Dewey House may refer to:

in the United States
(by state)
Dewey House, a building at University of Chicago, in Chicago, Illinois
Dewey House (North Chicago, Illinois), listed on the National Register of Historic Places in Lake County, Illinois
Joseph Dewey House, Westfield, Massachusetts, listed on the NRHP in Massachusetts
Francis Dewey House Worcester, Massachusetts, listed on the NRHP in Massachusetts 
Dewey Cottage, South Kingstown, Rhode Island, listed on the NRHP in Rhode Island
Dewey House (Hartford, Vermont), National Register of Historic Places in Windsor County, Vermont